Béni-Aïssi/At-Aïssi is a town and commune in Tizi Ouzou Province in northern Algeria. It is also where Lounès Matoub, a famous Kabyle musician, was assassinated on 25 June 1998.

References

Communes of Tizi Ouzou Province
Tizi Ouzou Province